Henry Lawrence (born September 26, 1951) is a former professional American football player. A twice Pro Bowler, he played in the National Football League for 13 seasons as an offensive tackle with the Oakland / Los Angeles Raiders. He played in Super Bowl XI and was a starter in Super Bowl XV and Super Bowl XVIII for the Raiders earning three Super Bowl Championship Rings. Lawrence is a member of Alpha Phi Alpha fraternity.  At the 2010 Alpha Phi Alpha Convention, Henry was the recipient of the Jesse Owens Achievement Award for his athletic excellence.

Lawrence has five children: Ishmael Lawrence, Isaac Lawrence, Juliet Lawrence, Itanza Lawrence and Portia Whitaker.

References

External links
NFL.com player page

1951 births
Living people
People from Montour County, Pennsylvania
American football offensive tackles
Players of American football from Pennsylvania
Florida A&M Rattlers football players
Oakland Raiders players
Los Angeles Raiders players
American Conference Pro Bowl players